The Dundee Comets are a Scottish ice hockey team, based in the city of Dundee, coached by John Dolan, former Dundee Stars Legend. They play at the Dundee Ice Arena, along with the Dundee Stars Elite Team and the Dundee Tigers SNL team.

The Comets play in the Scottish National League, and are current 2011–12 SNL Champions, 2011–12 Scottish Cup Champions and 2012 Spring Cup Champions. They also won all these titles in 2010–11.

Club roster 2020–21

2020/21 Outgoing

References

Ice hockey teams in Scotland
Sport in Dundee
Ice hockey clubs established in 2008
2008 establishments in Scotland